VH1  was a British and Irish pay television channel that was owned by ViacomCBS. The channel was based on the original VH1 American channel of the same name. On 24 November until 26 December 2017, VH1 was renamed temporarily as VH1 Christmas. The channel ceased broadcasting on Tuesday 7 January 2020.

History
VH1 UK was first launched on 10 October 1994 as a complementary network to the youth-orientated MTV. It originally took the same focus at launch as the main American network of a focus on mainly adult contemporary artists for an audience between 21-44, with a broad playlist involving music videos from the 70s to the present day along with weekly countdowns, a format maintained until around 2008.

Besides the American network's features and programming (including programme marathons such as Pop-Up Video), a unique feature of the network was Ten of the Best, in which an artist's video is played, then the artist's personal top ten list being played with explanations from the artists for their choices. The same concept was also carried by VH2, but with their alternative artists.

Final format 
On 1 May 2018, VH1 moved to Sky channel 174 and as a result, the channel took on a general entertainment focus, matching the American network, though due to the American VH1's programmes being licensed to other networks or broadcasters, it carried content from Channel 5 or MTV. VH1 completed its transition to a general entertainment format in October 2018 with VH1 US programs, including Love & Hip Hop: Miami and Ru Paul's Drag Race, though music programmes continued in non-prime timeslots. VH1 Christmas moved to MTV Rocks.

In March 2019, VH1, along with sister channel BET moved EPG numbers on Sky. VH1 moved to 160 and BET moved to 173, swapping places with PBS America and Together TV respectively.

In December 2019, BT TV announced that VH1 would be leaving the UK market along with Universal TV and that the channel would close on 7 January 2020, the same day as sister channel 5Spike. The EPG channel slot was deprecated on all platforms except Virgin Media UK, where MTV Classic replaced it after a ten-year absence.

Final programming

Are You the One? (the last programme broadcast at 3.15am before the channel closed)
Basketball Wives
Black Ink Crew
Cruising with Jane McDonald
Fire Island
The Hills
L.A. Hair
Love & Hip Hop: Miami
Love & Hip Hop: New York
The Real Housewives of Atlanta
The Real Housewives of Orange County
RuPaul's Drag Race
RuPaul's Drag Race All Stars
Snog Marry Avoid?
Teen Mom

Former sister channels
VH1 inspired two spin-off channels, both of which have since switched to MTV spin-offs:

VH1 Classic (launched 1 July 1999; closed 1 March 2010) played all-time greats from the 1960s to the 1990s. The channel was rebranded as MTV Classic.
VH2 (launched 16 December 2003; closed 1 August 2006) showed mainly music videos and live concerts. It focused on rock, indie and punk music and branded itself as "the alternative to manufactured pop". The channel was replaced by MTV Flux, which itself was replaced by MTV +1.

See also
VH1

External links
 VH1 at MTV.co.uk

References

Defunct television channels in the United Kingdom
Music video networks in the United Kingdom
Television channels and stations established in 1994
Television channels and stations disestablished in 2020
VH1
Television channel articles with incorrect naming style
1994 establishments in the United Kingdom
2020 disestablishments in the United Kingdom